Janbolat Mamai (born 15 June 1988) is a Kazakh journalist and political activist who serves as the leader of the Democratic Party of Kazakhstan and editor of the Tribuna newspaper.

Early life and education
Mamai was born in the city of Alma-Ata to a family of teachers.

In 2007, he completed an internship at the National and Kapodistrian University of Athens. Mamai then continued his studies at the Abylay Khan Kazakh University of International Relations and World Languages at the Department of English Philology.

He worked in the newspaper Jas Alash. In his articles, Mamai raised acute social problems and corruption issues among high-ranking officials. In a series of materials “Billionaires. Who are they?" Mamai scourged those who rob their people and unjustly make huge profit.

Political activities

Zhanaozen
In June 2012, after the Zhanaozen massacre, Mamai was arrested on charges of “inciting social hatred” due to his participation in the oil worker strike. He personally covered and commented on other publications about the rights of protesting oil workers and criticized the authorities regarding the prosecution of oil industry protesters, referring to the Constitution of the Republic of Kazakhstan and international laws that Kazakhstan has ratified and which guarantee citizens the right to peaceful rallies and protests. He spent several months in prison. Mamai was released on 13 July 2012.

Tribuna newspaper
Since September 2012, Mamai has been the head of an independent newspaper Tribuna, which published highly critical materials regarding the current government and a number of officials. The main topic of the newspaper was the observance of the rights and freedoms of the citizens of Kazakhstan. Thus, the newspaper supported Max Bokaev and Talgat Ayan, human rights activists and civic activists who were sentenced to 5 years in prison for participating in a peaceful protest.

Over the period of its existence, the publication has been repeatedly subjected to lawsuits against its publications. Several times, Tribuna was unable to pay for lawsuits, closed and then came out under a different name, retaining its direction.

Arrest and trial
On 10 February 2017, in Almaty, at the editorial office of Tribuna, in the apartments and relatives of Mamai, Imanbai, the accountant of the newspaper, and the founder of the newspaper publishing company, searches were conducted in the house of politician Tulegen Zhukeyev as a part of investigative actions carried out by the National Anti-Corruption Bureau regarding the alleged theft of money at BTA Bank.

Mamai was suspected of committing a criminal offense; however, he denied his guilt and on 11 February, made a statement that he considers his persecution to be politically motivated. In the late evening of 11 February, investigating judge Baidauletova announced the decision to arrest Mamai for two months for the period of the investigation, and on 20 February, the court of appeal of the civil panel of the Almaty city court upheld this decision. Mamai was placed in the remand prison.

On 21 February, after a meeting between Mamai and his lawyer Janara Balgabaeva, it became known that on 17 February, without explanation, he was transferred from the quarantine of cell a pre-trial detention center to the cell where prisoners were serving a sentence for particularly serious crimes. In his cell, Mamai said that he was beaten with a loss of consciousness which was shown by abrasions and bruises on his body that were visible during a visit by the special prosecutor for supervision of places of detention. Mamai also dealt with extortionists who demanded an amount of 2,000,000 tenge which was later reduced to 200,000 tenge, by calling from the camera to the telephone of Mamai's wife Inga Imanbai who received death threats. In addition, the extortionists demanded Mamai abandon to abandon politics.

On 7 September 2017, the court banned Mamai from being involved in journalism for 3 years.

In January 2022 , he was detained for participating in protest actions 2022 Kazakh unrest, and on March 16, Zhanbolat was detained on charges of insulting a government official and spreading deliberately false information.

References

1988 births
Living people
People from Almaty